Ishq Pashmina is an Indian Romantic film written and directed by Arvind Pandey and produced by Krishna Shanti Production, starring  Malti Chahar, Bhavin Bhanushali, Zarina Wahab, and Brijendra Kala.

Cast 
Bhavin Bhanushali

Malti Chahar

Zarina Wahab

Brijendra Kala

Kainat Arora

Gaurika Mishra

Vijay Mishra

Yash Chaurasia

Vikram Sharma

Ashna Soni

References 

Indian romance films
2020s Hindi-language films